allo-Inositol is a stereoisomer of inositol.

See also
cis-Inositol
D-chiro-Inositol
L-chiro-Inositol
epi-Inositol
muco-Inositol
neo-Inositol
scyllo-Inositol

References

Inositol